Durban Harbour's Congella of 1902 was a South African steam locomotive from the pre-Union era in the Colony of Natal.

In 1902, the Harbours Department of the Natal Government placed a single  saddle-tank locomotive named Congella in service as dock shunting engine in Durban Harbour.

Port Advisory Board
In 1898, a Port Advisory Board was established in Durban, consisting of seven members who represented the Colonial Government as well as commercial and municipal entities. The board was responsible for the management, control, improvement, development and maintenance of the facilities at Durban Harbour.

Railway operations in the harbour became the responsibility of the Harbours Department of the Government of Natal.

Manufacturer
In 1902, the Natal Harbours Department placed a single 0-4-0ST locomotive in service at Durban Harbour. It was built by Hudswell, Clarke and Company of Leeds and was not numbered, but named Congella.

Service
The fate of the locomotive is not known. The engine Congella was no longer in service at the harbour when the South African Railways and Harbours classification and renumbering scheme was executed in 1912.

References

0510
0510
0-4-0 locomotives
B locomotives
Hudswell Clarke locomotives
Cape gauge railway locomotives
Railway locomotives introduced in 1902
1902 in South Africa
Scrapped locomotives